Paul Charlton (born 10 March 1970), known as The Mighty Jingles, is a British YouTuber and retired veteran of the Royal Navy. In 2012, he started a channel on YouTube, in which he primarily shares Let's Play video game commentaries on various games. As of November 2021, The Mighty Jingles has over 650,000 subscribers.

Biography
Paul Charlton was born in Newcastle upon Tyne, England. His father was a Paratrooper who had separated from his mother in 1974, and later died while serving in the French Foreign Legion. In 1978 his mother remarried and the family moved to South Africa, where his stepfather worked for the South African Iron and Steel Industrial Corporation (Iscor). After a year there, his parents moved to Swaziland. Charlton started his early education at a boarding school in Barberton, Transvaal during South Africa's turbulent apartheid period. In 1986, his family moved back to England.

Military career
Charlton joined the Royal Navy in 1989 as a Radio Operator on HMS Brazen. He moved on to being a Writer, a branch title that was subsequently changed to Logistician Personnel (Writer). A Veteran of the First Gulf War, he retired from the Royal Navy in 2011, after 22 years of service on six ships: apart from HMS Brazen, HMS Coventry, HMS Southampton, HMS Nottingham, HMS Newcastle, and HMS Manchester.

YouTube
At first, Charlton used his YouTube channel to store World of Tanks replays for his own personal use.  Inspired by other Let's Play videos, Charlton posted his first video on June 16th, 2012, which was a replay of himself playing the Chinese Type 59 tank in World of Tanks along with his own commentary. Charlton became known for his World of Tanks videos, which Die Welt in 2014 stated having attracted 250,000 subscribers. His main YouTube account has over 650,000 subscribers (November 2021).

His content include Mingles with Jingles on Mondays, where he chats about personal subjects and/or comments on present events in the gaming community. Tuesday through Saturdays consist of Let's Play replays, mostly World of Tanks and World of Warships. Other games of late include playthroughs of Assassin's Creed Valhalla, Red Dead Redemption 2, Cyberpunk 2077, Far Cry 6 and the Subnautica series.

He also has a cooking channel called Home with the Gnome in which he tries various recipes.

Community Contributor
 The Mighty Jingles was in the Wargaming Community Contributor Program until May 22, 2017
 The Mighty Jingles was in the World of Warships Community Contributor Program from February 19, 2018 to August 14, 2021.

Inclusion in Games
 The Mighty Jingles is included in World of Warships as a playable British Commander.
 The Mighty Jingles was (is) included in Fractured Space as a playable Captain, accompanied by his spacedog Boo by the May 2015 patch for current players up to that point.

Additions to Gamer Terminology
 When doing replays of sent-in material, if the sender's player alias is too hard to pronounce, The Mighty Jingles always refers to the player as Dave. This has caused a number of people over recent years to open player accounts with the name Dave included, now making may into The Mighty Jingles replays.
 His War Thunder videos are the origin of the gamer term Jingles landing, in which Jingles is notorious for crash landing any plane he is trying to land. He has even been able to perform a Jingles landing with a submarine in his playthrough of the game Cold Waters.
 In World of Tanks, the 152 mm BL-10 gun on the tier IX Object 704 and previously also the tier VIII ISU-152, was nicknamed the Trollcannon by The Mighty Jingles:"This gun has absolutely monstrous alpha damage, but sometimes, it just decides it can't hit the broad side of a barn.  From the inside."
 In World of Tanks, the nick name Bert the Avenger was coined by YouTuber Circonflexes for the self-propelled gun FV304 in 2013, which was subsequently used and spread by The Mighty Jingles in his videos.

Personal life
Charlton lived either in military accommodation or in rented housing until his 52nd birthday. He bought a house and moved there after his 52nd birthday.

Bibliography
 Lister, David and Charlton, Paul. (2018) Forgotten Tanks and Guns of the 1920s, 1930s and 1940s.

Decorations 
  The Gulf Medal
  The Naval Long Service and Good Conduct Medal (2004)

References

Living people
1970 births
People from Newcastle upon Tyne
British YouTubers